The Coradia 1000 is a type of Diesel Multiple Unit (DMU) operating in Great Britain and which is part of the Alstom Coradia family of diesel and electric multiple units.

, these DMUs are operated by three different train operating companies. Transport for Wales Rail operates the Class 175, and the Class 180 is operated by Grand Central and East Midlands Railway.

Design
Both of the Coradia 1000 models utilise a diesel-hydraulic powertrain with transmissions being supplied by German manufacturer Voith.
The diesel engines were supplied by American manufacturer Cummins.

When both classes were new, they featured hydrodynamic retarders as part of their braking equipment. However, due to the unreliability of this equipment on both the Class 175 and Class 180, they were bypassed with the DMUs now just using their normal air brakes.

The Class 175 and Class 180 are capable of working in a multiple unit arrangement with each other, however they cannot work with other classes.

Operators

Class 175

Current
 Transport for Wales Rail

Former

Class 180

Current

Former

Gallery

References

Sources

External links

Alstom Coradia